Velhoania is a genus of moths in the  family Tortricidae. It consists of only one species, Velhoania paradoxa, which is found in Brazil in the states of Mato Grosso and Rondônia.

The wingspan is about 6 mm. The ground colour is white with yellow brown markings. The hindwings are brownish grey, but transparent in the basal half.

Etymology
The generic name refers to a part of the name of type locality of the type-species, Porto Velho. The species name refers to the unusual structures of the male genitalia and is derived from Greek paradoxos (meaning incredible).

References

Cochylini
Monotypic moth genera
Tortricidae genera